Pascal Chidi Bolu (born 23 November 2000), is a Nigerian footballer who plays as a forward for Romanian Liga III side Dante Botoșani.

Career
On 17 September 2021, Chidi signed for FC Van. On 11 February 2022, Chidi left Van by mutual agreement.

Career statistics

Club

Notes

References

External links
 

2000 births
Living people
Nigerian footballers
Nigerian expatriate footballers
Association football forwards
Moldovan Super Liga players
UAE First Division League players
Armenian Premier League players
Liga III players
FC Zimbru Chișinău players
Khor Fakkan Sports Club players
FC Van players
Dibba Al-Hisn Sports Club players
Expatriate footballers in Moldova
Expatriate footballers in the United Arab Emirates
Expatriate footballers in Armenia
Expatriate footballers in Romania
Nigerian expatriate sportspeople in Moldova
Nigerian expatriate sportspeople in the United Arab Emirates
Nigerian expatriate sportspeople in Armenia
Nigerian expatriate sportspeople in Romania